Zhang Yazhong may refer to:
Chang Ya-chung (born 1954), Taiwanese political scientist
Yia-Chung Chang, Taiwanese physicist